William Tefft Johnson, Jr. (September 23, 1883 – October 15, 1956), better known as Tefft Johnson, was an American stage and film actor, and film director and screenwriter. He appeared in 131 films between 1909 and 1926.

Biography
Johnson was born in Washington, D.C., on September 23, 1883, to William Tefft Johnson and his wife, Anne Wheeler Johnson. He had two sisters and a brother.  His father was a soldier and chaplain who was born in Cooperstown, New York in 1834.  His father served in the Union Army during the American Civil War, and was wounded at the Battle of Chancellorsville.  Discharged because of his wounds, his father sought and won recommission in the army.  After the war, his father studied law and was admitted to practice before the D.C. and federal bar.

Johnson was already an actor, traveling across the United States, at the age of 15.  His father died in 1898, and his mother in 1926.  His mother largely disinherited him, leaving her $50,000 estate (which consisted primarily of a house in Washington, D.C.) to his sister, Abby.  Johnson sued in 1927 to receive one-third of the estate, but a court of equity denied his claim in 1930.

After a long career on the stage, he joined the Edison Studios film company.  He moved to the Vitagraph Company in 1911. He played in Vitagraph's 1911 version of Vanity Fair with John Bunny, Leo Delaney, Rose Tapley and Helen Gardner. In 1912 he appeared in the film Henry VIII as Cardinal Thomas Wolsey with co-stars Clara Kimball Young, Julia Swayne Gordon, and Hal Reid. While at Vitagraph, Johnson became a film director, helming more than 50 films. These included many of the "Sonny Jim" comedies (about a mischievous child).  He also wrote three films.

In 1932, he posed as George Washington for two artistic efforts.  The first was for painter Hattie Elizabeth Burdette.  Johnson posed in a Masonic apron wearing the same jewel Washington himself had worn. The chair in the painting also belonged to Washington, and the pedestal and background cloth belonged to the Alexandria-Washington Lodge (which Washington had once led).  The painting was used to advertise the Washington Bicentennial in 1932.  The second occurred on September 17, 1932, when he portrayed Washington during a re-enactment of Washington laying the cornerstone of the United States Capitol.  The cornerstone ceremony re-enactment was filmed by the Washington Bicentennial Commission.

Tefft Johnson died on October 15, 1956.

Selected filmography
 Twelfth Night (1910)*short
 The Child Crusoes (1911)*short
 His Sister's Children (1911)*short
 Cardinal Wolsey (1912)*short
As You Like It (1912)*short
 The Lion's Bride (1913)*short
C.O.D. (1914)
The Battle Cry of Peace(1915)
 Love's Law (1917)
 Striving for Fortune (1926)

References

External links

1883 births
1956 deaths
American male film actors
American male silent film actors
American film directors
American male screenwriters
19th-century American male actors
American male stage actors
Male actors from Washington, D.C.
20th-century American male actors
Articles containing video clips
Screenwriters from Washington, D.C.
20th-century American male writers
20th-century American screenwriters